The NCAA Division II Men's Golf Championships, played in late May, is an annual competition in U.S. men's collegiate golf. From its inception through 2010, it was a 72-hole stroke play team competition, with an additional award for the lowest scoring individual competitor. The team format changed starting in 2011 to 54 holes of stroke play followed by an eight-team single elimination medal match play competition. The 54-hole individual leader is the individual champion.

Many of the individual champions have gone on to successful professional careers. The most successful individual winner is Lee Janzen (1986) who won eight times on the PGA Tour including two major championships, the 1993 and 1998 U.S. Opens.

Results

Stroke play (1963–2010)

Match play (2011–present) 

P = Won in a playoff
† = 54-hole tournament, scheduled
‡ = 54-hole tournament, due to weather

Multiple winners

Team
The following schools have won more than one team championship:
13: Florida Southern
6: Columbus State
3: Cal State Northridge, Troy State, USC Aiken
2: Lamar State, LSU-New Orleans, Rollins, Tampa, West Florida, Barry, Nova Southeastern, Lynn

Individual
The following men have won more than one individual championship:
2: Briny Baird, Tim Crouch, J. J. Jakovac, Jeff Leonard

Individual champion's school
The following schools have produced more than one individual champion:
9: Florida Southern
6: Columbus State
3: Cal State Northridge, Cal State Chico
2: Middle Tennessee State, Tampa, UC Riverside, Valdosta State, South Carolina-Aiken, Abilene Christian, Central Oklahoma, West Florida

See also
NAIA Men's Golf Championship

References

External links
NCAA men's golf

Division II
Golf, men's